List of Star Trek: Voyager novels based on the American science fiction television series of the same name. The book line is published by Simon & Schuster's imprints Pocket Books, Pocket Star, Gallery, and Atria.

Episode novelizations 
Based on select episodes from the television series:

Numbered novels 
Numbered paperback releases:

Original novels 
Includes hardcover and paperback releases:

Young adult novels 
Star Trek: VoyagerStarfleet Academy young adult miniseries explores the lives of the Voyager crew as Starfleet Academy cadets.

Omnibus editions 
Collections of novels from the Voyager book line.

Short story collections 
Collections featuring characters and settings from Voyager.

Miniseries

Dark Matters (2000) 
Star Trek: VoyagerDark Matters miniseries explores events after the episode "Eye of the Needle".

Spirit Walk (2004) 
Old Wounds (2004) is a direct sequel to The Farther Shore (2003). Enemy of My Enemy ties into the Star Trek: Destiny miniseries by David Mack.

String Theory (2005) 
Star Trek: VoyagerString Theory was published on the tenth-anniversary of the television series premiere. Cohesion (2005) opens with a violent encounter with the Nacene, a non-humanoid species featured in episodes "Caretaker" and "Cold Fire". The novels included conclusions to unresolved plots, and explanations for visual and narrative inconsistencies from the television series.

Relaunch novels 
Interlinked novels set after the episode "Endgame". Homecoming (2003) and The Farther Shore (2003), by Christie Golden, detail the aftermath of Voyager surprise return to Earth. From 2004 to 2009, characters from Voyager appeared in other Star Trek relaunch novels, as well as the Star Trek: Titan flagship series. Full Circle (2009) and Unworthy (2009), by Kirsten Beyer, served as a soft reset to the continuity of the series by resolving several Voyager-related plots and changes introduced in Star Trek novels published after Enemy of My Enemy (2004). Full Circle ties into Star Trek: Destiny, and its sequel series Typhon Pact.

See also 
 List of Star Trek novels

Notes

References

External links 
 
 

Book series introduced in 1995
 
Lists of novels based on works